Standing in the Dark is the debut studio album by Platinum Blonde. Released by Columbia/CBS Records Canada in 1983, it expanded on the band's original six-track EP. With the addition of four new tracks ("Standing in the Dark", "Sad Sad Rain", "Cast A Shadow", and "Leaders In Danger"), the album garnered the band their first taste of attention after going triple platinum in Canada. It reached a high of 23 on the Canadian charts.

Two of the music videos for this album, "Standing in the Dark" and "It Doesn't Really Matter", were nominated for Juno Awards for Video of the Year in 1984.

The album spawned four singles: "It Doesn't Really Matter," "Standing In The Dark," "Not In Love" and "Take It From Me". "Not In Love" was covered by Toronto-synth duo Crystal Castles, who are friends of lead Blonde Mark Holmes.

Track listing

Credits 
Platinum Blonde:
 Sergio Galli: guitar, backing vocals
 Mark Holmes: lead vocals, bass, keyboards
 Chis Steffler: drums, percussion

with "assisting musicians":
 Bruce Barrow
 Claude Desjardins
 Steve Sexton
 Jo-Anne Bates - backing vocal

The instruments these musicians played are not noted on the actual album package, but Barrow is normally a bassist, Desjardins a drummer/keyboardist, and Sexton a keyboard player.

Engineer:
 David Tickle, assisted by Hugh Cooper

References

1983 debut albums
Platinum Blonde (band) albums
CBS Records albums
Albums produced by David Tickle
Albums recorded at Metalworks Studios